Peter Anthony Larkins (born 22 June 1954 in Geelong, Victoria) is an Australian doctor and media personality as well as a former athlete.

Early life and athletics career
Larkins was educated at St Joseph's College in Geelong, where he was highly regarded and respected as a cheerful and down to earth person. He was very good at sport at school as well as being prominent in the school cadet unit. He later became a prominent track and field athlete who represented Australia in the steeplechase at the 1976 Summer Olympics 1982 Commonwealth Games and the 1981 World Cup. He won the national 3000 m steeplechase championships every year from 1976 to 1983, except for 1982 when he came second.

Medicine career
Among Larkins' education include an honours degree in medical science as well as Bachelor of Medicine and Bachelor of Surgery degrees. He travelled the world studying sports medicine and set up a private practice in the 1980s. He was one of the inaugural Fellows of the Australasian College of Sport and Exercise Physicians

Media career
In 1997, Larkins became the boundary rider for Triple M's Australian Football League coverage, with his prognoses on players' injuries becoming a popular and unique aspect of Triple M's coverage.

Larkins later joined the Nine Network as a boundary rider for AFL games. Later he served providing the latest player injury updates on The Sunday Footy Show.

In 2012, Larkins quit Triple M and joined rival 3AW in an identical role. He also joined the Seven Network to provide injury updates on AFL Game Day and during the network's Saturday night football coverage.

References

External links
Melbourne Sports Medicine Profile

Triple M profile

1954 births
Living people
Australian male steeplechase runners
Australian sports physicians
Australian rules football commentators
Australian people of Irish descent
Australian television presenters
Sportspeople from Geelong
Triple M presenters
Olympic athletes of Australia
Athletes (track and field) at the 1976 Summer Olympics
Athletes (track and field) at the 1982 Commonwealth Games
Commonwealth Games competitors for Australia